Luxoflux Corp. was an American video game developer founded by Peter Morawiec and Adrian Stephens in January 1997, and based in Santa Monica, California.

History
Luxoflux had a relatively small team size for its first few titles. The two founders plus Jeremy Engelman, David Goodrich and Edvard Toth created Luxoflux's first title Vigilante 8. The game was successful and was ported to the Nintendo 64, and it was followed by a sequel Vigilante 8: 2nd Offense in 1999.

In October 2002 Activision announced it had purchased Luxoflux, which at the time was working on True Crime: Streets of LA. The studio delivered the game and its sequel, True Crime: New York City, before working on licensed titles Kung Fu Panda and Transformers: Revenge of the Fallen.

On February 11, 2010, Activision announced it was time to shut down the studio as part of a widespread staff reduction that also included the shuttering of Underground Development.

Games

Cancelled:
King (2003 Videogame)

Isopod Labs
The original founders of Luxoflux eventually founded Isopod Labs and later announced Vigilante 8 Arcade that was released on Xbox Live Arcade in November 2008.

Games
Vigilante 8 Arcade
Jimmie Johnson's Anything with an Engine
Keep Off My Hill

References

External links
Archived Luxoflux page
Isopod Labs page

Defunct Activision subsidiaries
Companies based in Santa Monica, California
Video game companies established in 1997
Video game companies disestablished in 2010
Defunct video game companies of the United States
Former Vivendi subsidiaries
1997 establishments in California
2010 disestablishments in California
Defunct companies based in Greater Los Angeles